The Bulldog Shale is a formation of Early Cretaceous age (Aptian to Albian stages) that forms part of the Marree Subgroup of the Rolling Downs Group, located in the Eromanga Basin of South Australia, Queensland and New South Wales.

Description 
It is the lowermost unit in the Marree Subgroup, overlying the Cadna-owie Formation and is overlain by the Coorikiana Sandstone. The formation dates to the Aptian to Albian stages of the Early Cretaceous. The Bulldog Shale is composed of finely laminated carbonaceous and pyritic mudstone and claystone beds. Weathering has caused heavy leaching and bleaching in some regions of the Bulldog Shale, including those around Coober Pedy, so that the rocks are white or multicolored. These horizons contain rich opal deposits. Horizons without this bleaching are primarily composed of organic-rich shale. Gypsum, in addition to carbonate limestone concretions rich in fossils are common in these unbleached shaly horizons.

Fossil content 

The Bulldog Shale has yielded fossils of plants, invertebrates, fish, and reptiles. The macroinvertebrate fauna of this formation includes several molluscs, such belemnites, gastropods, and bivalves. Fish are represented by chimaeras and ray-finned fish (these include teleosts) and a lungfish. Sharks are conspicuously absent in the Bulldog Shale. Many plesiosaurs are known from the formation, including leptocleidids,  elasmosaurids, pliosaurids, and possible polycotylids. Ichthyosaurs are also present. Archosaur fossils from the Bulldog Shale are rare, and are represented mostly indeterminate specimens, some of which can be assigned to Dinosauria. Due to the coastal location of the Bulldog Shale, large amounts of wood have also been recovered in this formation.

Paleobiota

Archosaurs

Plesiosaurs

Ichthyosaurs

Chondrichthyes

Invertebrates

See also 
 Fossiliferous stratigraphic units in Australia
 Toolebuc Formation, Albian fossiliferous formation of the northern Eromanga Basin
 Wallumbilla Formation, contemporaneous fossiliferous formation of the northern Eromanga Basin
 Bungil Formation, Valanginian to Aptian fossiliferous formation of the Surat Basin
 Eumeralla Formation, contemporaneous fossiliferous formation of the Otway Basin
 Wonthaggi Formation, Valanginian to Aptian fossiliferous formation of the Gippsland Basin
 Aptian formations
 Crato Formation, contemporaneous Lagerstätte of northeastern Brazil
 Elrhaz Formation, contemporaneous fossiliferous formation of Niger
 Jiufotang Formation, contemporaneous fossiliferous formation of northeastern China
 Paja Formation, contemporaneous Lagerstätte of central Colombia
 Tookoonooka crater

References

Further reading 
 B. P. Kear. 2007. A juvenile pliosauroid plesiosaur (Reptilia: Sauropterygia) from the Lower Cretaceous of South Australia. Journal of Paleontology 81(1):154-162
 R. E. Molnar. 1991. Fossil reptiles in Australia. In P. Vickers-Rich, J. M. Monaghan, R. F. Baird, & T. H. Rich (eds.), Vertebrate Paleontology of Australasia 605-702
 R. E. Molnar. 1980. Australian late Mesozoic continental tetrapods: some implications. Mémoires de la Société Géologique de France, Nouvelle Série 139:131-143

Geologic formations of Australia
Cretaceous System of Australia
Albian Stage
Aptian Stage
Shale formations
Mudstone formations
Evaporite deposits
Shallow marine deposits
Fossiliferous stratigraphic units of Oceania
Paleontology in South Australia